Lewis Melican (born 4 November 1996) is a professional Australian rules footballer playing for the Sydney Swans in the Australian Football League (AFL). He was drafted by Sydney with their third selection and fifty-second overall in the 2015 rookie draft. He made his debut in the forty-two point loss against  at the Sydney Cricket Ground in round five of the 2017 season.

Melican received the AFL Rising Star nomination for round 18 after restricting  key forward Nick Riewoldt to ten disposals and one goal in the Swans' forty-two point win at the Sydney Cricket Ground.

Statistics
Updated to the end of the 2022 season.

|-
| 2015 ||  || 43
| 0 || – || – || – || – || – || – || – || – || – || – || – || – || – || –
|- 
| 2016 ||  || 43
| 0 || – || – || – || – || – || – || – || – || – || – || – || – || – || –
|-
| 2017 ||  || 43
| 17 || 1 || 1 || 112 || 91 || 203 || 62 || 31 || 0.1 || 0.1 || 6.6 || 5.4 || 11.9 || 3.6 || 1.8
|- 
| 2018 ||  || 43
| 3 || 0 || 0 || 26 || 14 || 40 || 9 || 5 || 0.0 || 0.0 || 8.7 || 4.7 || 13.3 || 3.0 || 1.7
|-
| 2019 ||  || 43
| 17 || 0 || 0 || 109 || 66 || 175 || 56 || 36 || 0.0 || 0.0 || 6.4 || 3.9 || 10.3 || 3.3 || 2.1
|- 
| 2020 ||  || 43
| 9 || 0 || 0 || 52 || 37 || 89 || 21 || 14 || 0.0 || 0.0 || 5.8 || 4.1 || 9.9 || 2.3 || 1.6
|-
| 2021 ||  || 43
| 6 || 0 || 0 || 53 || 23 || 76 || 30 || 5 || 0.0 || 0.0 || 8.8 || 3.8 || 12.7 || 5.0 || 0.8
|- 
| 2022 ||  || 43
| 0 || – || – || – || – || – || – || – || – || – || – || – || – || – || –
|- class=sortbottom
! colspan=3 | Career
! 52 !! 1 !! 1 !! 352 !! 231 !! 583 !! 178 !! 91 !! 0.0 !! 0.0 !! 6.8 !! 4.4 !! 11.2 !! 3.4 !! 1.8
|}

Honours and achievements
Individual
 AFL Rising Star nominee: 2017 (round 18)

References

External links

1996 births
Living people
Sydney Swans players
Geelong Falcons players
Australian rules footballers from Victoria (Australia)